The 1972–73 Vancouver Canucks season was the team's 3rd in the NHL. Vancouver finished 7th in the East Division for the second consecutive season, failing to reach the playoffs again.

Regular season

Final standings

Schedule and results

Awards and records

Trophies and awards
Cyclone Taylor Award (Canucks MVP): Orland Kurtenbach
Cyrus H. McLean Trophy (Canucks Leading Scorer): Bobby Schmautz
Babe Pratt Trophy (Canucks Outstanding Defenceman): Barry Wilkins
Fred J. Hume Award (Canucks Unsung Hero): Dennis Kearns
Most Exciting Player: Bobby Schmautz

Draft picks
Vancouver's picks at the 1972 NHL Amateur Draft. The draft was held at the Queen Elizabeth Hotel in Montreal, Quebec.

See also
1972–73 NHL season

References

 

Vancouver Canucks seasons
Vanc
Vanc